Calathus vividus is a species of ground beetle from the Platyninae subfamily that is endemic to Madeira.

References

vividus
Beetles described in 1801
Endemic fauna of Madeira
Beetles of Europe